Greatest Hits is a compilation album by Stevie Ray Vaughan and Double Trouble released in 1995. It was also released on vinyl in the U.S.

Track listing
"Taxman" (George Harrison) – 3:34 (previously unreleased)
"Texas Flood" (Larry Davis, Joseph Wade Scott) – 5:22 (from Texas Flood)
"The House Is Rockin'" (Stevie Ray Vaughan, Doyle Bramhall) – 2:24 (from In Step)
"Pride and Joy" (Vaughan) – 3:40 (from Texas Flood)
"Tightrope" (Vaughan, Bramhall) – 4:39 (from In Step)
"Little Wing" (Jimi Hendrix) – 6:49 (from The Sky Is Crying)
"Crossfire" (Tommy Shannon, Chris Layton, Reese Wynans, Bill Carter, Ruth Ellsworth) – 4:10 (from In Step)
"Change It" (Bramhall) – 3:59 (from Soul to Soul)
"Cold Shot" (Mike Kindred, Arranged by Stevie Ray Vaughan) – 4:01 (from Couldn't Stand the Weather)
"Couldn't Stand the Weather" (Vaughan) – 4:42 (from Couldn't Stand the Weather)
"Life Without You" (Vaughan) – 4:16 (from Soul to Soul)

Charts

Certifications

References

Stevie Ray Vaughan albums
1995 greatest hits albums